Paltoga is a rural locality (a village) in Vytegorsky District of Vologda Oblast, Russia.  Population: 295 (2002).

It was founded in 2001 as a merger of several villages.

References 

Rural localities in Vytegorsky District